Whatcom Watch is a monthly newspaper in Whatcom County, Washington.  The newspaper focuses on community and environmental issues. It is volunteer-run and publishes once a month.

References

External links
 Official website

Newspapers published in Washington (state)
Bellingham, Washington